WHDM (1440 AM, "Oldies Radio") is a radio station broadcasting an oldies music format. Licensed to McKenzie, Tennessee, United States, the station is currently owned by Forever Media, through licensee Forever South Licenses, LLC, and features programming from Citadel Media.

References

External links

Oldies radio stations in the United States
HDM
Carroll County, Tennessee